The NWA Canadian Heavyweight Championship was the top singles title in Maple Leaf Wrestling from 1978 until 1984, when it was abandoned after the Toronto promotion partnered with the World Wrestling Federation (WWF). Its national scope was in name only, similar to the NWA National Heavyweight Championship in Georgia. The title was reinstated as the present-day, NWA Board-controlled version of the NWA Canadian Heavyweight title. Previous versions also existed in Calgary, Halifax and Vancouver. Has been defended in the World Wrestling Federation.

Title history

Reigns by combined length

Key

Footnotes

See also
List of National Wrestling Alliance championships
NWA Canadian Heavyweight Championship (Calgary version)
NWA Canadian Heavyweight Championship (Halifax version)
NWA Canadian Heavyweight Championship (Vancouver version)
NWA National Heavyweight Championship, counterpart in the United States, originally a regional championship before being acquired by the NWA Board

References

External links
Solie.org Canadian Heavyweight Title history
ECCW.com Canadian Heavyweight Championship history
NWA Canadian Heavyweight Championship history

Elite Canadian Championship Wrestling championships
Heavyweight wrestling championships
Maple Leaf Wrestling championships
National Wrestling Alliance championships
Canadian professional wrestling championships